Francisco Malespín Herrera (1806 – 25 November 1846) was a Salvadoran military officer and politician, elected as the president of El Salvador in 1844. He served from 7 February 1844 to 15 February 1845, when he was deposed by his vice president Joaquín Eufrasio Guzmán after invading and overthrowing the liberal government in Nicaraguan. He also led El Salvador to a short unsuccessful war against Guatemala. After being deposed, Malespin returned to El Salvador with forces from Honduras, but he was captured and assassinated. Some of Malespin's closest allies were Francisco Ferrera in Honduras as well as Juan Lindo, both conservatives. He was supported by Honduras after his downfall.

Like many other conservatives, Malespín opposed Francisco Morazán, a prominent liberal politician, who opposed dissolving the Federal Republic of Central America.

References 

Presidents of El Salvador
1806 births
1846 deaths
People from Sonsonate Department
Leaders ousted by a coup
Salvadoran military personnel